The 1983 Limerick Senior Hurling Championship was the 89th staging of the Limerick Senior Hurling Championship since its establishment by the Limerick County Board.

Patrickswell were the defending champions.

On 11 September 1983, Patrickswell won the championship after a 1-13 to 1-07 defeat of Ballybrown in the final. It was their eighth championship title overall and their second title in succession.

Results

Final

References

Limerick Senior Hurling Championship
Limerick Senior Hurling Championship